Nitinat River Provincial Park is a provincial park in the Canadian province of British Columbia on Vancouver Island.

The 160-hectare park is on the Nitinat River, upstream from Nitinat Lake, and has no developed camping or day-use facilities. Access is by an unmaintained trail from Nitinat Road. The nearest communities are Port Alberni, Lake Cowichan, and Port Renfrew.

The park is divided into two parcels about 9 kilometres apart along the course of Nitinat River. The western most portion is called Bridge Pool and is accessed from the bridge that crosses the Nitinat River. This parcel is located upstream from Little Nitinat River and downstream from Jasper Creek. The other parcel is located farther upstream at the point where Granite Creek meets the Nitinat River. This parcel is not intended for recreational use.

See also
List of British Columbia Provincial Parks
List of protected areas of British Columbia

References

External links

A tourism-oriented review of the park

West Coast of Vancouver Island
Provincial parks of British Columbia
1996 establishments in British Columbia
Protected areas established in 1996